is a kart racing game released in arcades by Sega in 1988. More technologically advanced than Sega's earlier 2.5D racing games, like Hang-On (1985) and Out Run (1986), in Power Drift the entire world and track consist of sprites. The upgraded hardware of the Sega Y Board allows individual sprites and the background to be rotated–even while being scaled–making the visuals more dynamic.

Designed and directed by Yu Suzuki, the game was a critical and commercial success upon release in arcades. It was subsequently ported to various home computers in Europe by Activision in 1989, followed by a PC Engine port published in Japan by Asmik Ace in 1990. It was not released on Sega consoles until the Sega Ages release for the Sega Saturn in 1998.

Gameplay

The objective is to finish each race in third place or better in order to advance to the next stage. Players have the option of continuing if they finish the race in fourth place or lower before the game is over. However, the player's score will not increase upon continuing the game.

Courses
The tracks have a roller coaster feel to them, with many steep climbs and falls, as well as the ability to "fall" off higher levels. To add to this feeling, the sit-down cabinet was built atop a raised hydraulic platform, and the machine would tilt and shake quite violently. Each circuit, labeled from "A" to "E" has a certain theme to it (for example, circuit A has cities, circuit B has deserts, circuit C has beaches, etc.) in a series of five tracks. There are also four laps for each course.
Course A was Springfield Ovalshape, Foofy Hilltop, Snowhill Drive, Octopus Oval and Curry De Parl, Course B was Swingshot City, Phantom Riverbend, Octangular Ovalshape, Charlotte Beach and Highland Spheres, Course C was Bum Beach, Jason Bendyline, Nighthawk City, Zanussi Island and Wasteman Freefall, Course D was Mexico Colours, Oxygen Desert, Jamie Road, Monaco Da Farce and Blow Hairpin, Course E was Aisthorpe Springrose Valley, Patterson Nightcity, Lydia Rightaway, Bungalow Ridgeway and Karen Longway, The two extra stages with Courses A, C and E resemble a jet fighter from After Burner II and Courses B and D resemble a superbike from Super Hang-On.

If players place first on all five tracks (which is indicated by all five gold trophies on the number of wins display behind the course letter), an "Extra Stage" is unlocked, where the assigned car is a vehicle from other Sega games. Courses A, C and E allow players to race with the F-14 Tomcat fighter jet from the After Burner series in the Extra Stage, while courses B and D have an option to race the motorcycle from the Hang-On series. Players also can press the start button while in a race to see a rear view.

Music
Each course in the game has a theme song:

Ports 
Power Drift was later ported to the Amstrad CPC, Commodore 64, MSX, Amiga, Atari ST, MS-DOS and ZX Spectrum home computers by Activision and released in 1989. The home computer ports lack the tilting action seen in the original arcade version. A PC Engine version was developed by Copya Systems and published exclusively in Japan by Asmik Ace Entertainment on April 13, 1990.

A Sega Mega Drive version was planned but never released. A 32X port was in development by Sega, but not published. Dempa was working on a Sega CD conversion that also did not reach store shelves.

Sega later included Power Drift in the Sega Saturn compilation series Sega Ages released on February 26, 1998 and in Yu Suzuki Game Works Vol. 1 for the Dreamcast on December 1, 2001.

Reception 
In Japan, Game Machine listed Power Drift on their 1988 issue as being the second most-successful upright arcade unit of the month. It went on to be the fourth highest-grossing arcade game of 1989 in Japan. The ZX Spectrum port knocked the long-standing RoboCop from the top of the UK sales charts in 1989.

The arcade game received positive reviews from critics upon release in 1988. Sinclair User magazine rated it 10 out of 10, comparing it favorably with Sega's earlier arcade hit Out Run (1986) and stating it was technically "a breakthrough", while praising the "breathtaking" graphics and "heartstopping" gameplay. Andy Smith of Advanced Computer Entertainment said it was an "exciting" and "thrilling high speed" racing game in "a futuristic car cum-Go-Kart" that "combines all that was best" in Out Run and Buggy Boy (1985) to come up "with a terrific driving game that looks set to be a winner".

GameFan magazine reviewed the PC Engine version, scoring it 172 out of 200.

Sinclair User gave the arcade version of Power Drift the "Racing Game of 1988" award. They said it was, "without doubt, the single most spectacular game ever to arrive in an arcade". They explained, "the blinding speed of the game and the astonishing way that the track zooms up and down, side to side as you participate in the race of a lifetime can be described in no lesser term than fab".

Legacy
Guinness World Records gave Power Drift the award for "First kart racing videogame" as it predated Super Mario Kart (1992).

References

External links

Power Drift at Arcade History
Power Drift Sega Y Board hardware at System16
Power Drift at Gamebase 64

1988 video games
Amiga games
Amstrad CPC games
Arcade video games
Atari ST games
Cancelled Sega 32X games
Cancelled Sega CD games
Cancelled Sega Genesis games
Commodore 64 games
DOS games
MSX games
Kart racing video games
Racing video games
Sega-AM2 games
Sega arcade games
TurboGrafx-16 games
Video games designed by Yu Suzuki
Video games developed in Japan
Video games featuring female protagonists
Video games scored by Alberto Jose González
Video games scored by David Lowe
Video games scored by Hiroshi Kawaguchi
ZX Spectrum games